The Nongoma Local Municipality council consists of forty-two members elected by mixed-member proportional representation. Twenty-one councillors are elected by first-past-the-post voting in twenty-one wards, while the remaining twenty-one are chosen from party lists so that the total number of party representatives is proportional to the number of votes received.

In the election of 3 August 2016  the Inkatha Freedom Party (IFP) won a majority of twenty-two seats on the council. The party lost its majority in the election of 1 November 2021, obtaining a plurality of twenty-one seats.

Results 
The following table shows the composition of the council after past elections.

December 2000 election

The following table shows the results of the 2000 election.

March 2006 election

The following table shows the results of the 2006 election.

May 2011 election

The following table shows the results of the 2011 election.

August 2016 election

The following table shows the results of the 2016 election.

November 2021 election

The following table shows the results of the 2021 election.

References

Nongoma
Elections in KwaZulu-Natal
Zululand District Municipality